Atlanta is an unincorporated community located in Chickasaw County, Mississippi, United States.

Atlanta has a zip code of 39776. A post office operated under the name Atlanta from 1874 to 1908.

References

Unincorporated communities in Chickasaw County, Mississippi
Unincorporated communities in Mississippi